Mathias Flaga Olesen (born 21 March 2001) is a Danish-Luxembourger professional football player who plays for Bundesliga club 1. FC Köln and the Luxembourg national team.

International career 
Olesen made his international debut for Luxembourg on the 11 November 2021.

Personal life
Born in Denmark, Olesen moved to Luxembourg at the age of 6 with his family, as his father got a job there in the investment industry. Olesen attended the European School of Luxembourg II (ESL2).

References

External links

2001 births
Living people
Footballers from Copenhagen
Luxembourgian footballers
Luxembourg youth international footballers
Luxembourg international footballers
Danish men's footballers
Danish emigrants to Luxembourg
Luxembourgian people of Danish descent
Naturalised citizens of Luxembourg
Association football midfielders
1. FC Köln players
1. FC Köln II players
SV Eintracht Trier 05 players
Bundesliga players
Regionalliga players
Luxembourgian expatriate footballers
Danish expatriate men's footballers
Expatriate footballers in Germany
Luxembourgian expatriate sportspeople in Germany
Danish expatriate sportspeople in Germany